Mandinka, Mandika, Mandinkha, Mandinko, or Mandingo may refer to:

Media 
 Mandingo (novel), a bestselling novel published in 1957
 Mandingo (film), a 1975 film based on the eponymous 1957 novel
 Mandingo (play), a play by Jack Kirkland
 "Mandinka" (song), by Sinead O'Connor from her 1987 album The Lion and the Cobra

People 
 Mandingo people of Sierra Leone
 Mandingo Wars (1883–1898), between France and the Wassoulou Empire of the Mandingo
 Mandinka language
 Mandinka people of West Africa
 Wassoulou Empire, also known as the Mandinka Empire
 Madinkhaya, an eastern variant of the Syriac alphabet
 Mandingo, a stereotype of African American men

See also 
 Django Unchained, which features Mandingo fights

Language and nationality disambiguation pages